Dragotinci may refer to:

 Dragotinci, Sveti Jurij ob Ščavnici, a village in Slovenia
 Dragotinci, Croatia, a village near Petrinja, Croatia

See also
 Dragotintsi, a village in Bulgaria